Litorimonas taeanensis is a Gram-negative, aerobic and heterotrophic bacterium from the genus of Litorimonas which has been isolated from the beach of Taean in Korea.

References 

Rhodobacterales
Bacteria described in 2011